Rogelio is a masculine Spanish given name and a variant of the first name Roger. Notable people with the name include:

Rogelio Antonio, Jr. (born 1962), Filipino chess player
Rogelio Armenteros (born 1994), Cuban pitcher in Major League Baseball
Rogelio Barriga Rivas (1912–1961), Mexican author born in Tlacolula, Oaxaca
Rogelio Bernal Andreo (born 1969), Spanish-American astrophotographer
Rogelio Chávez (born 1984) a Mexican footballer
Rogelio de la Rosa (1916–1986), Filipino matinee idol of the 20th century
Rogelio Delgado (born 1959), retired football central defender
Rogelio Domínguez (1931–2004), Argentine football goalkeeper
Rogelio Figueroa (born 1963), the 2008 gubernatorial candidate for the Puerto Ricans for Puerto Rico party
Rogelio Frigerio (born 1970), Argentine economist and minister of interior
Rogelio Julio Frigerio (1914–2006), Argentine economist, journalist and politician
Rogelio Funes Mori (born 1991), Mexican football forward
Rogelio López (born 1980), Mexican racecar driver from Aguascalientes
Rogelio Marcelo (born 1965), Cuban boxer
Rogelio Martínez (born 1918), pitcher in Major League Baseball
Rogelio Martínez (born 1974), Dominican Republic boxer
Rogelio Melencio (1939–1995), Filipino basketball player and coach
Rogelio Miranda, Bolivian general
Rogelio Ordoñez (born 1940), Filipino writer, poet, playwright and columnist
Rogelio Pina Estrada, Cuban attorney and member of the World Scout Committee
Rogelio Pizarro (born 1979), male track and field athlete
Rogelio R. Sikat (1940–1997), Filipino fictionist, playwright, translator and educator
Rogelio Ramírez de la O, economist based in Mexico City
Rogelio Rodriguez (born 1976), Mexican footballer
Rogelio Roxas (died 1993), Filipino soldier and locksmith who found a hidden chamber full of gold
Rogelio Salmona (1929–2007), Colombian architect of Sephardic and Occitan descent
Rogelio Yrurtia (1879–1950), Argentine sculptor of the Realist school
Sergio Rogelio Castillo (born 1970), Argentine-Bolivian football midfielder

See also
Captain Rogelio Castillo National Airport (IATA: CYW, ICAO: MMCY) is an airport located at Celaya, Guanajuato, Mexico
Estadio Rogelio Livieres, multi-use stadium in Asunción, Paraguay

Spanish masculine given names

pt:Rogelio